The Columbus Municipal School District is a public school district based and physically located in Columbus, Mississippi (USA).  In addition to Columbus, the district also serves the children of the Columbus Air Force Base military personnel.  The Columbus Municipal School District is governed by a five-member school board. CMSD's mascot is the falcon. The district is also the home of the oldest public school in Mississippi, Franklin Academy, which was founded in 1821.  The CMSD currently consists of approximately 4,100 students enrolled in grades Pre-K through grade 12.

Administrative Personnel

Columbus School Board
Yvonne Cox, President
Telisa Young, Vice President
Josie Shumake, Secretary
Jason Spears, Trustee
Fredrick Sparks, Trustee

District Administration
Dr. Cherie Labat, Superintendent
Dr. Glenn Dedeaux, Assistant Superintendent 
Holly Rogers,  Chief Financial Officer
Greg Hunley, Director of Human Resources
JC Lawton, Director of Technology

District Schools

District Schools

Columbus High School
Columbus Middle School
Joe Cook Elementary School
Franklin Academy
Fairview Elementary School
Sale Elementary School
Stokes-Beard Elementary School
McKellar Technology Center
Columbus Success Academy

Building Level Administrators

Columbus High School
Craig Chapman,
Principal

Columbus Middle School
Freda Dismukes,
Principal

Franklin Academy
Patricia Overstreet,
Principal

Joe Cook Elementary School
Dr. Tim Wilcox,
Principal

Fairview Elementary School
Melinda Robinson,
Principal

Sale Elementary School
Aaron Lee, Principal

Stokes-Beard Elementary School
Tanesha Jennings,
Principal

McKellar Technology Center
Chris Bray,
Director

Columbus Success Academy
LaShandra Garrett,
Principal

See also
List of school districts in Mississippi

References

External links
 

Columbus, Mississippi
Education in Lowndes County, Mississippi
School districts in Mississippi